15th Film Critics Circle of Australia Awards

14 November 2005

Best Film:

Look Both Ways

Best Foreign Film - English language:

Million Dollar Baby
The 15th Film Critics Circle of Australia Awards, given on 14 November 2005, honored the best in film for 2005.

Winners
Best Actor: 
William McInnes - Look Both Ways
Best Actress: 
Cate Blanchett - Little Fish
Best Australian Feature Documentary: 
Rash
Best Australian Short Documentary: 
Girl in a Mirror
Best Australian Short Film: 
Jewboy 
Best Cinematography: 
The Proposition - Benoît Delhomme
Best Director: 
Sarah Watt - Look Both Ways
Best Editor: 
Denise Haratzis - Look Both Ways
Best Film: 
Look Both Ways
Best Foreign Film – English Language: 
Million Dollar Baby 
Best Foreign Language Film: 
Mar adentro (The Sea Inside), Spain
Best Musical Score: 
The Proposition - Nick Cave and Warren Ellis 
Best Screenplay - Adapted: 
Three Dollars - Robert Connolly and Elliot Perlman 
Best Screenplay - Original: 
Look Both Ways - Sarah Watt
Best Supporting Actor: 
Hugo Weaving - Little Fish
Best Supporting Actress: 
Noni Hazlehurst - Little Fish
Acknowledgement of Emerging Talent: 
Tim Dean (directing)

References

 Film Critics Circle Of Australia

2005 in Australian cinema
Film Critics Circle of Australia Awards
A